Derzhavinka is a rural locality (a selo) in Sosnovsky Selsoviet of Seryshevsky District, Amur Oblast, Russia. The population was 118 as of 2018. There are 3 streets.

Geography 
Derzhavinka is located 39 km east of Seryshevo (the district's administrative centre) by road. Sosnovka is the nearest rural locality.

References 

Rural localities in Seryshevsky District